Sainte-Livrade XIII are a French Rugby league club based in Sainte-Livrade in the region of Lot-et-Garonne in southern France. The club was founded in 1939. They currently play in the National Division 2 Aquitaine regional league.

History 

Founded in 1939 just prior to the outbreak of World War II as SSL XIII Les Aigles Livradois, the club due to the Vichy Government was forced to close down almost immediately due to the banning of the sport of Rugby League. It wasn't until season 77/78 that they reached a major final, where they lost out narrowly to Realmont XIII in the National 2, now called the National Division 1, final 13-14. The Coupe Falcou would bring success as they lifted the cup on no fewer than 4 occasions, 87, 94, 2000 and 2002. Promotion at the start of the new millennium, following a league re-structure, took them into the 2nd tier Elite Two Championship and in season 2002/03 they won the competition when they beat heavy favourites UTC 2 25-15. Despite winning the league the club didn't get promoted due to their size and slowly the better players left which eventually cost the club their 2nd tier status. The steady decline continued resulting in another relegation to the 4th and bottom tier. Season 2013/14 saw them top the regional Aquitaine League.

France International Players 

 Christian Clar
 Christian Sabatie

Notable players

 Pascal Baratie
 Alain Delpech
 Michel Delpech
 Jules Favaretto
 Antoni Maria

Club honours 

 Elite Two Championship (1): 2002-03
 Coupe Falcou (4): 1987, 1994, 2000, 2002

See also 

National Division 2

References

French rugby league teams
1939 establishments in France
Rugby clubs established in 1939